The following lists events that happened during 1964 in the Republic of the Congo (Léopoldville).

Incumbents 
 President: Joseph Kasa-Vubu
 Prime Minister: Cyrille Adoula

Events

See also

 Republic of the Congo (Léopoldville)
 History of the Democratic Republic of the Congo
 Congo Crisis
 1964 in the Democratic Republic of the Congo

References

Sources

 
Republic of the Congo (Léopoldville)
Republic of the Congo (Léopoldville)